The Hong Kong men's national volleyball team represents Hong Kong in international competitions and friendly matches, governed by Volleyball Association of Hong Kong (VBAHK).

Results

Olympic Games

1964 to 2020 — Did not qualify

FIVB World Championship

1949 to 2022 — Did not enter or Did not qualify

FIVB World Cup

1965 to 2019 — Did not qualify

Asian Championship
 Champions   Runners up   Third place   Fourth place

Asian Games
 Champions   Runners up   Third place   Fourth place

Asian Cup
 Champions   Runners up   Third place   Fourth place

Team

Current squad
The following is the Hong Kong roster for the 2022 Asian Men's Volleyball Cup.

Head Coach:  Dragan Mihailovic

Former squad
 Asian Men's Volleyball Championship
2021
So Chun Hin (c), Au Chin To, Lau Chi Wing, Leung Ho Yin, Cheung Yi Kit, Lam Cheuk Hin, Chow Pak Fai, Lam Ki Fung, Yuen Sze Wai, Poon Chi Leung, Lam Yi Chun, Tam Chun Ho Damian, Lai Chun Hung, Cheung Ngai Yiu. Head Coach:  Yau Hok Chun.

Notable players
 Henry Chan

References

Hong Kong
Volleyball
Volleyball in Hong Kong